The 2013–14 Fairfield Stags men's basketball team represented Fairfield University during the 2013–14 NCAA Division I men's basketball season. The Stags, led by third year head coach Sydney Johnson, played their home games at Webster Bank Arena and were members of the Metro Atlantic Athletic Conference. They finished the season 7–25, 4–16 in MAAC play to finish in tenth place. They lost in the first round of the MAAC tournament to Saint Peter's.

Roster

Schedule

|-
! colspan="9" style="background:#c41e3a; color:#fff;"| Exhibition

|-
! colspan="9" style="background:#c41e3a; color:#fff;"| Regular season

|-
! colspan="9" style="background:#c41e3a; color:#fff;"| 2014 MAAC tournament

* The December 11 game was postponed after Fairfield's flight to Nashville was cancelled to due inclement weather. The game was rescheduled for January 20.

References

Fairfield Stags men's basketball seasons
Fairfield
Fairfield Stags
Fairfield Stags